Paola Peñarrieta (born 16 May 1969) is a Bolivian swimmer. She competed in three events at the 1992 Summer Olympics.

References

External links
 

1969 births
Living people
Bolivian female swimmers
Olympic swimmers of Bolivia
Swimmers at the 1992 Summer Olympics
Place of birth missing (living people)